Michael Deiter (born September 3, 1996) is an American football center for the Miami Dolphins of the National Football League (NFL). He played college football at Wisconsin, and was drafted by the Dolphins in the third round of the 2019 NFL Draft.

Early years
Deiter attended Genoa Area High School in Genoa, Ohio. While there, he played high school football. In his junior season, he was selected Northern Buckeye Conference all-conference as both offensive lineman and defensive lineman in 2012. During his senior season, he was named Northern Buckeye Conference lineman of the year, first-team All-Ohio on offensive line, also earning Associated Press District IV Lineman of the Year and Great Lakes Region Lineman of the Year honors while leading Genoa (OH) to 10–1 record.

College career
Deiter redshirted his Freshman season at Wisconsin. As a Redshirt Freshman in 2015, he earned his first letter, starting all 13 games, including seven starts at left guard and six starts at center, including the season's final five games. Following the regular season, he was named All-Big Ten honorable mention (media) and Big Ten All-Freshman (ESPN).  During his Redshirt Sophomore season in 2016, he earned his second letter, starting all 14 games, including 10 starts at center and four starts at left guard, helping Wisconsin to a Big Ten Conference West Division Championship and a #9 final season ranking. Following the regular season, he was named a consensus All-Big Ten honorable mention.

Prior to the 2017 season, Deiter was named to the 2017 Outland Trophy and Rimington Trophy watch lists. Athlon Sports named him 2nd-team All-Big Ten.

On September 28, 2017, SB Nation named Deiter a frontrunner for the annual "Piesman" Trophy, an award awarded to a collegiate Lineman doing "decidedly un-lineman things" for his 4 yard rushing touchdown against Illinois.

Deiter considered forgoing his senior year and declaring for the 2018 NFL Draft, but decided to return to Wisconsin to play at the guard position after playing tackle during his junior year.  Returning to Wisconsin, Deiter was named an offensive captain for the team along with Alex Hornibrook.  Prior to the season, Deiter was named an AP second-team pre-season All American.

Professional career

Deiter was drafted by the Miami Dolphins in the third round, 78th overall, in the 2019 NFL Draft. As a rookie, he appeared in all 16 regular season games and started 15.

Deiter entered the 2021 season as the Dolphins starting center. He was placed on injured reserve on October 2, 2021. He was activated on December 4.

References

External links
Miami Dolphins bio
Wisconsin Badgers bio

1996 births
Living people
Miami Dolphins players
People from Lucas County, Ohio
People from Ottawa County, Ohio
Players of American football from Ohio
Wisconsin Badgers football players